The QCW-05 (also referred to as the Type 05 Suppressed Submachine Gun) is a suppressed bullpup submachine gun, manufactured and developed by the People's Liberation Army (PLA) 208 Research Institute and Jianshe Industries (Group) Corporation of Chongqing under the China South Industries Group for the People's Liberation Army Ground Force, the People's Liberation Army Special Operations Forces and the People's Armed Police. This weapon is designed for the 5.8×21mm DCV05 sub-sonic round that is also used by the QSW-06 Silenced Pistol.

Development
In October 2001 the Jianshe Industries (Group) Corporation (owned by the China South Industries Group) won a bid to produce the PLA's next generation of submachine gun to replace the Type 79 and the Type 85 silenced submachine guns, beating out other competitors such as the Changfeng CF-05 due to its ease of construction and operation. At the 2005 International Police Equipment Expo in Beijing, Jianshe revealed their final product, a bullpup, blowback, open bolt submachine gun that externally resembled the QBZ-95 assault rifle which was then given the designation QCW-05. At the 2006 MILIPOL Expo, a smaller police and export version of the QCW-05 called the 'Jianshe JS 9mm', a silenced submachine gun, was revealed to the public. The 'JS 9mm' is chambered for the popular 9×19mm Parabellum caliber. The QCW-05 is intended to be PLA's frontline personal defense weapon for personnel in non-combat roles such as vehicle crews and aircrews who would normally be confined to quarters where a full assault rifle would be unwieldy and by specialized operation units such as the People's Liberation Army Special Operations Forces and People's Armed Police.

Design details

The QCW-05 is a blowback, open bolt bullpup silenced submachine gun that is capable of either full automatic or semi-automatic fire. The QCW-05s light weight can be attributed to its small aluminum receiver and polymer construction which also lends itself well towards quicker mass-production. It has a low rate of fire in order to maintain controllability, a feature stressed from the beginning by the PLA for a weapon as light as a submachine gun. There is a thumb fire mode selector on the left side of the weapon directly above the grip with a semi-automatic position (1), full automatic (2), and safety (0) and an ejection port on the right side of the weapon. A removable metal screw-on cylindrical suppressor is attached to the barrel of the gun. The carrying handle, which is located above the compact aluminum receiver, houses the charging handle. The use of the 5.8×21mm DV05 subsonic round reduced the QCW-05's muzzle velocity to approximately 150 m/s and gives the submachine gun an effective range of 50 meters which is considered adequate for a silenced weapon. 
Ammunition is fed from a detachable curved fifty round, four column, double stacked box (another initial requirement of the PLA) at the rear of the submachine gun.

As the QCW-05 is designed for general military use rather than being used only in a specialized niche role, a suppressor can be a hindrance when a situation calls for an emphasis on the performance or size of the weapon rather than its noise reduction capabilities, which is why the suppressor is removable, or in the case of the QCQ-05 variant, completely absent. Once the suppressor is removed, the QCW-05 is essentially the same as the QCQ-05 and can fire the DAP92 round as well. The QCW-05 shares the common trait of other bullpup weapons of being suboptimal to fire from the left shoulder given the placement of the ejection port and its proximity to the operator's face when firing.

Variants

There are two variants of the QCW-05; the JS 9mm and the QCQ-05.

JS 9mm

A slightly smaller, somewhat externally different version of the QCW-05 designed for use by police and for export overseas. The JS 9mm is chambered for the 9×19mm Parabellum cartridge, and it also uses the same 30 round magazines used by the popular Heckler & Koch MP5 submachine gun. Another noticeable difference is that JS 9mm doesn't have a carrying handle, instead a picatinny rail could be mounted on the top.

QCQ-05
The QCQ-05 (officially translated in pinyin as Qiāng Chōngfēng Qīngxíng, literally 'Gun, Assault, Light') is a variant of the QCW-05 without the suppressor and is capable of using either the 5.8×21mm DCV05 subsonic pistol cartridge or the 5.8×21mm DAP92 pistol cartridge which is also used by the QSZ-92 pistol. While the QCQ-05 does not come with a suppressor, the QCW-05 suppressor can still be affixed and removed from the QCQ-05.

See also
List of bullpup firearms
List of submachine guns

References

External links
 Type 05 5.8mm / JS 9mm submachine gun - Modern Firearms

5.8 mm firearms
Bullpup firearms
Personal defense weapons
Weapons and ammunition introduced in 2005
Submachine guns of the People's Republic of China